Samuel A. DiPiazza Jr. is a former CEO of PricewaterhouseCoopers, and is the current chairman of Warner Bros. Discovery.

Early life and education
He received dual degrees in accounting and economics from the University of Alabama  where he became a member of Theta Chi Fraternity. He then went on to get his Master of Accountancy from the University of Houston. He is a licensed CPA.

Boards and memberships
Samuel DiPiazza is on the board of the World Trade Center Memorial Foundation. On October 12, 2005, Samuel DiPiazza was appointed to a second four-year term as chairman of the PricewaterhouseCoopers global, beginning on January 1, 2006. He stepped down as the global chairman on June 30, 2009, making way for Dennis Nally.

On January 21, 2014, Samuel DiPiazza was elected to the ProAssurance board of directors as the Chairman of the Audit Committee.

Samuel DiPiazza is also chairman of the board of trustees of the Mayo Clinic, a position he has held since February 2014.

References

External links
Official PwC biography

Year of birth missing (living people)
Living people
American accountants
University of Alabama alumni
University of Houston alumni
PricewaterhouseCoopers people
AT&T people
Warner Bros. Discovery people